"For the Rest of My Life" (also known as "4 the Rest of My Life") is a song by American R&B singer Robin Thicke from his sixth studio album Blurred Lines (2013). Written and produced by Thicke and ProJay, the song was serviced to urban adult contemporary radio as the second single from Blurred Lines on May 21, 2013.

Remix
The official remix is a duet with R&B singer Tamar Braxton and is called "For the Rest of My Life, Pt. 2". It premiered on the Atlanta urban contemporary radio station WVEE on  February 12, 2014. The remix was released as a digital single on February 25, 2014.

Commercial performance
"For the Rest of My Life" impacted urban adult contemporary radio in the United States on May 21, 2013 as the second single from Blurred Lines. Billboard described the song as having a "more familiar R&B vibe" appealing to Thicke's core fan base, following the release of the international hit "Blurred Lines". It was later released digitally to the iTunes Store on June 4, 2013. "For the Rest of My Life" became Thicke's fourth number-one hit on the Billboard Adult R&B Songs chart.

Charts

Release history

References

2013 singles
2013 songs
Robin Thicke songs
Songs written by Robin Thicke
Tamar Braxton songs
Interscope Records singles
Soul ballads
2010s ballads